Astro Boy is a Japanese media franchise. 

Astro Boy may also refer to:

Comics 
Astro Boy (character), the main character in Astro Boy media
Astro Boy (Akira Himekawa), a manga by Akira Himekawa
The Original Astro Boy, an American comic book series by NOW Comics

Film and television 
Astro Boy (1963 TV series), the first television series
Astro Boy (1980 TV series), the second television series
Astro Boy (2003 TV series), the third television series
Astro Boy (film), a CGI movie released in 2009

Music 
 "Astroboy (and the Proles on Parade)", a song by The Buggles from The Age of Plastic
 Astroboyz, a French record producing duo made up of Tom Grégoire and Pierre-Antoine Melki
 "Astro Boy" a song by Blonde Redhead from Blonde Redhead
"Astroboy", a song by FEMM from Femm-Isation

Video games 
Mighty Atom (1988 video game), the 1988 Famicom video game produced by Konami
Mighty Atom (1994 video game), the 1994 Super Famicom video game by Banpresto
Astro Boy (2004 video game), a video game for the PlayStation 2
Astro Boy: Omega Factor, the 2004 video game for the Game Boy Advance
Astro Boy: The Video Game, based on the 2009 CGI animated film of the same name